Greta Salóme Stefánsdóttir (born 11 November 1986), known outside Iceland simply as Greta Salóme, is an Icelandic singer, songwriter, and violinist in the Iceland Symphony Orchestra. She represented Iceland in the Eurovision Song Contest 2012 in Baku, Azerbaijan, in a duet with singer Jónsi with the song "Never Forget". They qualified from the first semi-final into the Eurovision final and eventually finished in 20th place with 46 points. She represented Iceland again, this time as a soloist, in the Eurovision Song Contest 2016 with the song "Hear Them Calling".

Career
Greta released her first album, titled In the Silence, on 16 November 2012. The album contains her Eurovision song "Never Forget", in both the English and the Icelandic version ("Mundu Eftir Mér"). In August 2012 she released Everything Around Me. It was announced that Greta was among the list of participants in Iceland's selection for Eurovision 2016 with the song "Raddirnar". She qualified from the first semi-final to participate in the final of the selection process. Her song was changed to English for the final, under the title "Hear Them Calling"; she won the national final. She represented Iceland performing the song in the first semi-final of Eurovision on 10 May 2016 placing fourteenth with 51 points. Recently, she had been finishing what will be her second studio album featuring her most recent singles. She also wrote the song "Crazy", which was performed by Raya and participated in UK's national selection for Eurovision Song Contest 2018

Discography

Studio albums

Singles

References

Notes
A  "Never Forget" did not appear on the official Belgian Ultratop 50 chart, but rather on the Ultratip chart, which combines "Airplay and Sales", at number 30.

B  "Raddirnar" is the original version of "Hear Them Calling", which was later translated into English.

Sources

External links
Gréta's Facebook  page

Eurovision Song Contest entrants of 2012
Living people
Greta Salome Stefansdottir
Greta Salome Stefansdottir
1986 births
Eurovision Song Contest entrants of 2016
Greta Salome Stefansdottir
Folk-pop singers
Greta Salome Stefansdottir
Greta Salome Stefansdottir
21st-century Icelandic women singers
21st-century violinists